The Lotus Evora is a sports car produced by British car manufacturer Lotus. The car, which was developed under the project name Project Eagle, was launched on 22 July 2008 at the British International Motor Show. The Evora S was launched in 2010 with a supercharged 3.5-litre V6. A facelifted and more powerful Evora 400 model was unveiled at the 2015 Geneva Motor Show, followed by another more powerful variant, the Evora GT430, which was unveiled in 2017.

The Lotus Evora is based on the first all-new vehicle platform from Lotus Cars since the introduction of the Lotus Elise in 1995 (the Exige and the 2006 Europa S are both derivatives of the Elise). The Evora was planned to be the first of three vehicles to be built on the same platform. The sales target was 2,000 cars per year, with prices between £45,000 and just over £50,000, and sales in America scheduled from the beginning of 2010.

Overview 

The Evora is the first product of a five-year plan started in 2006 to expand the Lotus lineup beyond its track-specialized offerings and produce a practical road car that would appeal to the mainstream market. The Evora is currently the only Lotus model with a 2+2 configuration, although it will also be offered in a two-seater configuration, referred to as the "Plus Zero" option. The Evora and the BMW i8 are the only 2+2 mid-engine coupés on sale. The interior is larger to accommodate taller passengers, such as former Lotus CEO Mike Kimberley and two people of 6'5" (195.6 cm).

The cooled boot behind the engine is large enough to fit a set of golf clubs, although Lotus design head Russell Carr denies that this was intentional. Lotus intends for the Evora to compete in different market sectors, including that of the Porsche 911.

Name 
The Evora name keeps the Lotus tradition of model names that begin with an E.  The name is derived from the words evolution, vogue and aura. Other names considered were Eagle, Exira and Ethos; Eagle and Ethos were rejected because they would be difficult for Lotus to claim as a trademark.

Specifications 
The Evora is equipped with a mid-mounted, transverse, Toyota-sourced 3.5-litre 24-valve 2GR V6 engine. The Evora S uses the same engine but with a supercharger. Both versions are available with either a six-speed manual or six-speed automatic transmission with "Intelligent Precision Shift," manufactured by Aisin. It is constructed on a lightweight aluminum tub with an additional front crash structure also made from aluminum, along with a steel rear sub-frame that houses the drivetrain. The chassis was designed to utilize proprietary 6000 Series alloy extrusions, which are bonded with an epoxy based adhesive and riveted together to increase torsional rigidity. The Evora also utilises a forged-aluminum, double-wishbone suspension with Bilstein high-performance gas dampers and Eibach coaxial coil springs. Hydraulically assisted power steering is included for increased maneuverability.

Models

Evora S 

 
In 2010, Lotus unveiled a high-performance variant of the Evora called the Evora S. The "S" in the name stands for "supercharged," but the engine is not intercooled. The car's exhaust was also replaced with a single-tubed exhaust system. The suspension's dampers were recalibrated to suit the vehicle's new suspension characteristics, and the steering also received recalibration. 

Lotus ceased production of the S in 2014 and later replaced it and the standard Evora with a new variant called the Evora 400 in 2015.

The Romanian police have an Evora S in their lineup as of 2012.

Evora 400 

The Evora 400 is a new variant that replaces the Evora and the Evora S. The "400" in the name is a reference to the vehicle's horsepower rating. The Evora 400 has an all-new body kit design, which helps produce an extra  of downforce. The exhaust has a new driver-activated system that allows the driver to increase the roar of the exhaust. The interior was slightly revised, notably with narrower sills for simplified entry and exit, a new dashboard design and a new centre-console design. The wheel set was also different, with forged wheels as a new option. The wing was changed to a split rear wing.

Acceleration from 0+ is at 4.1 seconds, 0.5 seconds faster than that of the S variant.

Evora Sport 410 

 
At the 2016 Geneva Motor Show, Lotus unveiled the Evora Sport 410, a slightly enhanced version of the 400.

The exterior was changed with the addition of a carbon-fibre roof, tailgate and front access panel. The wheels were further lightened and a lithium-ion battery was fitted rather than the traditional lead acid version. Inside, the rear seats were removed and one-piece carbon-fibre bucket seats were fitted.

Evora GT430 

In 2017, Lotus unveiled the most powerful variant of the Evora and also the fastest street-legal that Lotus has ever produced, the Evora GT430, though only 60 units were planned. The model is part of an entirely new range in the Evora family called the performance range. The car's 3.5-liter Toyota-derived V6 has an increased power output of  powered by an Edelbrock supercharger and a titanium exhaust system. The cars with automatic transmission weigh more because of the gear box and its cooling system. Because of the increased torque, the automatic-transmission cars have a slightly shorter 0- acceleration time of 3.6 seconds, compared with 3.7 seconds for manual-transmission cars. The GT430 also generates more downforce (250 kg at 190 mph) than did its previous variants.

The GT430 has a new and aggressive body kit that features a larger carbon-fibre rear wing, larger air intakes, forged aluminum wheels, polycarbonate lights and carbon-fibre bodywork to keep the weight low. The interior is also stripped down to save weight and the rear seats have been removed. The GT430 has carbon-fiber interior components and racing seats. It also features a plaque signifying the car's production number. The creature comforts are retained, with air conditioning included as standard.

Evora GT430 Sport and GT410 Sport 
Later in 2017, Lotus unveiled another variant of the Evora GT430 called the Evora GT430 Sport. It features a more aerodynamic body and removes the GT430's rear wing for smoother airflow and reduced drag.

To celebrate its 70th anniversary, Lotus unveiled the new Evora GT410 Sport. Available as a two-seater or 2+2, the GT410 Sport takes the GT430's basic shape and adds new composite front and rear body panels minus some of the 430's higher downforce pieces for a subtler shape. The revised front panel has larger carbon-fibre air ducts that move air around the front wheels more efficiently, cutting turbulence and drag. Deeper front and rear splitters and carbon ducts behind the rear wheels add downforce, which is increased by 211 pounds. Other carbon pieces include the front-access panel, roof panel and rear decklid. The car weighs ,  less than the 410.

Evora GT 

In June 2019, for the 2020 model year, Lotus introduced the Evora GT for the North American market only. Cars with the manual transmission feature a standard Torsen rear differential. Regardless of transmission choice, the 0- acceleration time is estimated at 3.8 seconds. The GT uses some of the same aero components as the GT410 Sport, which helps it produce  of downforce at maximum speed. The manual transmission weighs  less than the automatic. The Evora GT was discontinued after the 2021 model year and is set to be replaced by the all-new Lotus Emira in Spring 2022. 6,117 Evora have been produced overall.

Special editions

Evora 414E Hybrid 
In 2012, Lotus produced a prototype hybrid Evora, called 414E. Developed as a demonstration project for the UK Government's Technology Strategy Board, the range-extended electric coupe emits 55 g/km  and has an electric only driving range of 30 miles. When combined with the 3-cylinder 1.2-litre (1198 cc) petrol engine acting as a generator (as a similar manner to the Chevrolet Volt), the 414E has a range of 300 miles. The 414E formed the basis of the Infiniti Emerg-e concept car.

Evora S Carabinieri 

In July 2011, Lotus Cars donated two Evora S models with special equipment to the Carabinieri, the Italian gendarmerie. Lotus also pledged to handle the maintenance of the cars and the training for the drivers.

Evora GTE Road Car 
The Evora GTE road version is a variant of the Evora that was built to permit its racing variant to race under GT3 and LM GTE regulations. Only 25 units of this special edition were built. The road car uses the race car's engine and produces , making it the most powerful Lotus ever made.

Motorsport

LM GTE 

During the 2011 Geneva Motor Show, Lotus announced the Evora Enduro GT concept, as a follow up to the Type 124 and GT4 race cars. Lotus is aiming for this car to enter into the LM GTE category by mid-2011, with a  Toyota-supplied V8.

Lotus entered two Evoras at the 2011 24 Hours of Le Mans, which were run by the Jetalliance Racing team. Despite overheating issues during practice and qualifying, car No. 65 finished 22nd overall, completing 295 laps, whilst car No. 64 retired after 126 laps. The cars ran highly tuned, naturally aspirated variants of its factory V6 engine, instead of the aforementioned V8.

In 2012, Jetalliance Racing failed to negotiate a deal to run the cars in Europe; instead, Alex Job Racing chose to run a LM GTE in the American Le Mans Series. Alex Job Racing did not get a good outcome from this however, and the car was later replaced by a Ferrari 458 Italia GT2 as the main race car for the team.

Group GT4 

Ollie Hancock won the Nürburgring round of the 2010 GT4 European Cup season. A team including Johnny Mowlem, Stefano D'Aste and Gianni Giudici finished on the podium in the 2011 Dubai 24 Hour endurance race.

In 2011, Stefano D'Aste was the first Italian driver after Mario Andretti to win on Circuit Park Zandvoort with an official Lotus car and the car was the Evora GT4. D'Aste was in first position of the GT4 European Series till the last race but due to a problem that occurred to the engine he got a third position in the series, which was still good, considering that it was the first year that the official Lotus Evora GT4 took part to a full season competing with cars like the BMW M3, Porsche 911, Aston Martin Vantage GT4, and the Chevrolet Camaro.  The Evora proved capable of keeping up with these cars.

In 2012, Richard Adams, David Green and Martin Byford won the Britcar MSA British Endurance Championship in a Lotus Evora GT4.

GT300 

Cars Tokai ran a Lotus Evora from 2015 to 2021 in the GT300 class of Super GT, with backing from Lotus Cars Japan. Engineered by Mooncraft, the Evora GT300 MC was built to the series' "Mother Chassis" regulations, and as such, was a silhouette racing car sharing almost no parts with its production counterpart. As with all other Mother Chassis cars, it was built on a Dome chassis and powered by a Nissan VK45DE naturally aspirated V8. The Evora took its maiden victory at Fuji Speedway in 2020, followed by its second and last win at Twin Ring Motegi in 2021.

Reception
The Evora received several accolades at its launch from the British motoring press, including: Britain's Best Driver's Car 2009 from Autocar and Car of the Year 2009, from Evo.

The car was reviewed by Jeremy Clarkson on the television show Top Gear. Overall his review was positive: he was very happy with the performance, handling and comfort. He was extremely impressed with the ride comfort even after driving it into a field saying "Here, the suspension is taking the knocks, not me." and described the car as "the only car I've ever driven, ever, which is a killer attack dog and an old sofa". However, he considered the rear seats to have not enough legroom, the interior felt tinny and the satellite navigation was sub-optimal.

Road & Track put the Evora in #2 place in their annual "Performance Car of the Year" contest in 2017, noting the Evora is "fully deserving of the ACBC badge on its nose, this brave and charming two-plus-two is perhaps the finest over-the-road enthusiast vehicle available for sale at any price."

References

External links 

 
 SELOC TechWiki – Evora
 Anthology of Videos detailing the Evora model development and evolution

2+2 coupés
Evora
Sports cars
Rear mid-engine, rear-wheel-drive vehicles
Cars introduced in 2008
Cars introduced in 2009